Vince Grimes (born 13 May 1954) is an English former professional footballer who played as a midfielder.

Career
Born in Scunthorpe, Grimes played for Hull City, Bradford City, Scunthorpe United and Grantham.

References

1954 births
Living people
English footballers
Hull City A.F.C. players
Bradford City A.F.C. players
Scunthorpe United F.C. players
Grantham Town F.C. players
English Football League players
Association football midfielders